Alsó-Fehér was an administrative county (comitatus) of the Kingdom of Hungary. Its territory is now in western Romania (central Transylvania). The latest capital of the county was Nagyenyed (present-day Aiud).

Geography

Alsó-Fehér county shared borders with Hunyad, Torda-Aranyos, Kis-Küküllő, Nagy-Küküllő and Szeben counties. The rivers Mureș and Târnava flowed through the county. Its area was 3,576.5 km2 around 1910.

History
Alsó-Fehér (Lower Fehér) county was formed when Fehér county was split in 1744 (the other half, Felső-Fehér county, consisted entirely of enclaves between Székely and Saxon seats). In 1876, when the administrative structure of Transylvania was changed, the territory of Alsó-Fehér was modified and parts of it were annexed to the counties of Torda-Aranyos and Seben (during the same administrative reform, Felső-Fehér county was entirely abolished and merged with other counties). In 1920, the Treaty of Trianon assigned the territory of the county to Romania. Its territory lies in the present Romanian counties of Alba, Sibiu (the south-east) and Mureș (a small northeastern part).

Demographics

Subdivisions

In the early 20th century, the subdivisions of Alsó-Fehér county were:

Notes

References 

States and territories disestablished in 1920
Kingdom of Hungary counties in Transylvania